Graham Cregeen is a Manx politician who served as Member of the House of Keys for Arbory, Castletown & Malew in the Isle of Man until 2021. He was Minister for Justice and Home Affairs from 2020 to 2021.

Political career

In 2006 he was elected MHK for the former Malew and Santon constituency, and was re-elected for that constituency in 2011.

From 2006 to 2016 he was a political member of a variety of government departments in turn, and for a few weeks in 2012 he was Minister for Community, Culture and Leisure (a position that was abolished in 2014).

In 2016 he was elected MHK for the new Arbory, Castletown & Malew constituency, and appointed Minister for Education and Children. In 2017 the department was renamed as the Department of Education, Sport and Culture.

In 2020 he was appointed Minister for Justice and Home Affairs.

Election results

2011

2016 
In 2014, Tynwald approved recommendations from the Boundary Review Commission which saw the reform of the Island's electoral boundaries.

Under the new system, the Island was divided into 12 constituencies based on population, with each area represented by two members of the House of Keys.

As a result Cregeen's former constituency of Malew and Santon was abolished, with Santon becoming part of the constituency of Middle and Malew becoming part of the newly formed Arbory, Castletown and Malew.

References 

Living people
Manx people
Members of the House of Keys 2006–2011
Members of the House of Keys 2011–2016
Members of the House of Keys 2016–2021
Year of birth missing (living people)